is Hatsune Okumura's second single. It was released on February 13, 2008 by Avex Trax.

Overview
The release of  came almost six months since her last single and did not receive a tie-in.

Specifics
Artist: Okumura Hatsune
Title: 
Code: AVCD-31373/B CD+DVD; AVCD-31374 CD Only
Release Date: 2008.02.13
Price: ￥1,890 CD+DVD; ￥1,050 CD Only

Track list

CD Section
 
 
  (Instrumental)
  (Instrumental)

DVD Section
  (Music Clip)

Charts

Oricon Chart Positions

2008 singles
2008 songs